Shadiye Heydari (born 15 May 1967) is a Swedish politician (Social Democrat), who was a Member of Parliament 2010–2017, elected for the Gothenburg Municipality's constituency.

Life
Shadiye Heydari comes from the Iranian part of Saqqez, Kurdistan and came to Sweden in 1986. She lived in Sundsvall for ten years, and moved to Gothenburg in 1996, where she lives with her husband and their two children.

Activities
With an academic background in social work, she has worked as an assistant teacher, interpreter, administrator and unit manager in health and care. Prior to his assignment as a Member of Parliament, Shadiye has been involved as a leisure politician for eight years, first as chairman of the social committee and then as chairman of Lärjedalen's district committee.
During Shadiye's first term in the Riksdag in 2010–2014, she was a member of the Social Insurance Committee and a deputy in the Social Affairs Committee. After the formation of the government in 2014, she returned to the Riksdag as Deputy Prime Minister for Anna Johansson. During his second term as a Member of the Riksdag, Shadiye was a deputy member of the Civil Affairs Committee, the Foreign Affairs Committee, and a Personal Deputy Member of the Board of the Riksbank's Jubilee Fund. When Johansson left the government in July 2017, Heydari had to leave the Riksdag.
Shadiye Heydari also has several member assignments, including as a board member of both the Workers' Education Association in Gothenburg, the municipal parent company Förvaltnings AB Framtiden in Gothenburg and the S-association faith and solidarity at Hisingen. She sits on the district board for S-women Gothenburg and on the nomination committee for both S-women's future club, Hammarkullen's Social Democratic Association and the Kurdish Social Democratic Association. She is also the convener of the Angered district's nomination committee. In addition to these, she has undertaken additional assignments and is a member of several associations.
She is and has also been active in non-profit contexts with an extensive commitment over the years. Among other things, Shadiye has conducted project work concerning public education in human rights and disability between Sweden and Kurdistan.

References

External links

Shadieh Heydari at the Riksdag website

1967 births
Living people
Members of the Riksdag
Women members of the Riksdag
Swedish people of Iranian descent
Swedish people of Kurdish descent
Articles containing video clips
Swedish politicians of Iranian descent
21st-century Swedish women politicians
21st-century Swedish politicians
People from Saghez